This is a list of Carnegie libraries in Africa. Although most of Carnegie's philanthropic efforts were aimed at North America and Europe, a handful of libraries are scattered in other English-speaking areas of the world.

The vast majority of the Carnegie libraries in Africa were concentrated in South Africa. The Carnegie Corporation of New York continues to fund library investments in nearly a dozen countries in Africa to this day; however, no buildings have been granted since 1917.

Notes

References

Carnegie libraries
Africa
Carnegie libraries